The 2017 Rietumu Bank Latvian FIM Speedway Grand Prix was the third race of the 2017 Speedway Grand Prix season. It took place on May 27 at the Latvijas Spīdveja Centrs in Daugavpils, Latvia.

Riders 
First reserve Peter Kildemand replaced Nicki Pedersen, who was injured and not fit to race. The Speedway Grand Prix Commission also nominated Maksims Bogdanovs as the wild card, and Kjasts Puodžuks and Jevgeņijs Kostigovs both as Track Reserves.

Results 
The Grand Prix was won by Poland's Piotr Pawlicki Jr., who beat compatriots Patryk Dudek and Maciej Janowski and Australia's Jason Doyle in the final. It was the first Grand Prix win of Pawlicki Jr.'s career, and the first time in Grand Prix history that three riders from the same nation occupied the first three places on the podium.

Dudek's second-place finish resulted in him topping the overall standings. Previous series leader Fredrik Lindgren, who failed to make the semi-finals for the first time this year, slipped to joint-second place with Doyle, both just one point behind Dudek.

Heat details

Intermediate classification

See also 
 Motorcycle speedway

References 

Latvia
Speedway Grand Prix
Sport in Daugavpils
2017 in Latvian sport